Khashim Vashum is an Indian politician from Manipur. He was elected to the Manipur Legislative Assembly from Chingai in 2017 and 2022 Manipur Legislative Assembly election as a member of Naga People's Front and currently serves as Cabinet Minister for Animal husbandry & Veterinary and Transport department in Second N. Biren Singh ministry.

References

Living people
Manipur MLAs 2017–2022
Manipur MLAs 2022–2027
Naga People's Front politicians
1964 births
Naga people
People from Ukhrul district